PM2 is a process manager for the JavaScript runtime Node.js.
In 2016, PM2 was ranked as the 82nd most popular JavaScript project on GitHub.

Overview 
PM2 or Process Manager 2, is an Open Source, production ready Node.js process manager. Some key features of PM2 are automatic application load balancing, declarative application configuration, deployment system and monitoring.

Started in 2013 by Alexandre Strzelewicz. The code source is hosted on GitHub and installable via npm.

References

Further reading

External links 

JavaScript programming tools
Computer-related introductions in 2013